The II Bolivarian Games (Spanish: Juegos Bolivarianos) were a multi-sport event held between December 25, 1947, and January 8, 1948, at the Estadio Nacional de Perú in Lima, Perú. The Games were organized by the Bolivarian Sports Organization (ODEBO).

Originally, the Games were scheduled until January 6, 1948.  However, during the Games, the organizing committee realized that the football competition and some other events could not be finished in time, and decided to extend until January 8, 1948.

The Games were officially opened by Peruvian president José Luís Bustamante y Rivero.  The Colegio Militar Leoncio Prado in Callao served as "Bolivarian Village" (Villa Bolivariana) to host the athletes.

A detailed history of the early editions of the Bolivarian Games between 1938
and 1989 was published in a book written (in Spanish) by José Gamarra
Zorrilla, former president of the Bolivian Olympic Committee, and first
president (1976-1982) of ODESUR.  Gold medal winners from Ecuador were published by the Comité Olímpico Ecuatoriano.

Some photos from the cycling events can be found on the webpage in honour of Peruvian cyclist Pedro Mathey.

Venue

Participation 
As of December 23, 1947, a total of 931 athletes from 6 countries were reported to participate:

 (103)
 (180)
 (78)
 (50)
 (400)
 (120)

Another source reports the participation of only 600 athletes.

Sports 
It is reported that the Games featured 22 disciplines.  The following sports were explicitly mentioned:

Aquatic sports 
 Diving
 Swimming
 Water polo
 Athletics
 Baseball
 Basketball
 Billiards
 Boxing
 Chess
Cycling 
 Road cycling
 Track cycling
 Equestrian
 Fencing
 Football
 Golf
 Shooting
 Tennis
 Volleyball
 Weightlifting
 Wrestling

The list is incomplete.

Medal count
The medal count for these Games is tabulated below.  This table is sorted by the number of gold medals earned by each country.  The number of silver medals is taken into consideration next, and then the number of bronze medals.

References 

Bolivarian Games
B
B
Bolivarian Games
Bolivarian Games
Bolivarian Games
Bolivarian Games
B
Sports competitions in Lima
Multi-sport events in Peru
1940s in Lima
December 1947 sports events in South America
January 1948 sports events in South America